A list of films produced in Portugal in the 2010s, ordered by year of release. For an alphabetical list of Portuguese films see :Category:Portuguese films.

2000
List of Portuguese films of 2000

2001
 List of Portuguese films of 2001

2002
List of Portuguese films of 2002

2003
List of Portuguese films of 2003

2004 
List of Portuguese films of 2004

2005 
List of Portuguese films of 2005

2006 
List of Portuguese films of 2006

2007 
List of Portuguese films of 2007

2008 
List of Portuguese films of 2008

2009 
List of Portuguese films of 2009

External links
 Portuguese film at the Internet Movie Database

 

Films
Portuguese